Burning River Roller Derby is a women's flat-track roller derby league based in Cleveland, Ohio. Founded in 2006, Burning River is a member of the Women's Flat Track Derby Association (WFTDA).

History and organization
Burning River Roller Derby was started as Burning River Roller Girls in 2006, and joined the Women's Flat Track Derby Association (WFTDA) in December 2007.
Burning River Roller Derby has three travel teams that play against other teams from other leagues. The A team, "Burning River All-Stars", plays WFTDA-sanctioned games. The B team, "Burning River Hazmat Crew", plays competitive regional games, and the C team, "Burning River Pyromaniacs", plays very close, regional games. The league also has four home teams who play each other in league play, the Cleveland Steamers, the Hard Knockers, the HellBombers, and the Rolling Pin-Ups.

In early 2015, Burning River announced the change of the league name from Burning River Roller Girls to Burning River Roller Derby, to place less emphasis on gender and better reflect its members. In August 2015, Burning River hosted a WFTDA Division 2 playoff tournament.

WFTDA competition
In 2009 Burning River was the ninth seed at the WFTDA North Central Regional Tournament and finished in eighth place after an overtime loss to Brewcity Bruisers, 126-116. In 2013, the WFTDA changed their playoff structure, and Burning River qualified for the WFTDA Division 2 International Playoff tournament in Kalamazoo, Michigan as the ninth seed, ultimately finishing in eighth place.

Rankings

References

External links
Official Website

Roller derby leagues in Ohio
Women's sports in the United States
Sports in Cleveland
Roller derby leagues established in 2006
2006 establishments in Ohio
Women's sports in Ohio